Naomi Elaine Campbell (born 22 May 1970) is an English Supermodel, actress, singer, and businesswoman. She began her career at the age of 15, and established herself amongst the most recognisable and in-demand models of the past four decades. Campbell was one of six models of her generation declared :supermodels by the fashion industry and the international press.

In addition to her modelling career, Campbell has embarked on other ventures, including an R&B studio album and several acting appearances in film and television, such as the modelling-competition reality show The Face and its international offshoots. Campbell is also involved in charity work for various causes.

Early life 

Naomi Elaine Campbell was born in Lambeth, South London to Jamaican-born dancer Valerie Morris on 22 May 1970. In accordance with her mother's wishes, Campbell has never met her father, who abandoned her mother when she was four months pregnant and went unnamed on her birth certificate. She took the surname "Campbell" from her mother's second marriage. Her half-brother Pierre was born in 1985. Campbell is of Afro-Jamaican and Chinese-Jamaican descent. Her Chinese heritage comes through her paternal grandmother, whose surname was Ming.

Campbell spent her early years in Rome, Italy, where her mother worked as a modern dancer. On their return to London, she lived with relatives while her mother travelled across Europe with the dance troupe Fantastica. From age three, Campbell attended the Barbara Speake Stage School and at 10 she was accepted into the Italia Conti Academy of Theatre Arts, where she studied ballet. She also attended Dunraven School.

Career

1978–1986: Career beginnings 

In 1978 at age 8, Campbell made her first public appearance in the music video for Bob Marley's "Is This Love". She tap-danced in 1983 in the music video for Culture Club's "I'll Tumble 4 Ya" and "Mistake number 3", in 1984. She had studied dance from age 3 to 16, and originally intended to be a dancer. In 1986, while still a student of the Italia Conti Academy of Theatre Arts, Campbell was scouted by Beth Boldt, head of the Synchro Model Agency, while window-shopping in Covent Garden. Her career quickly took off—in April, just before her 16th birthday she appeared on the cover of British Elle.

1987–1997: International success 
Over the next few years, Campbell's career progressed steadily: she walked the catwalk for such designers as Gianni Versace, Azzedine Alaïa, and Isaac Mizrahi and posed for such photographers as Peter Lindbergh, Herb Ritts, and Bruce Weber. By the late 1980s, Campbell, with Christy Turlington and Linda Evangelista, had formed a trio known as the "Trinity", who became the most recognisable and in-demand models of their generation.

When faced with racial discrimination, Campbell received support from her white friends; she later quoted Turlington and Evangelista as telling Dolce & Gabbana, "If you don't use Naomi, you don't get us." In December 1987, she appeared on the cover of British Vogue, as that publication's first black cover girl since 1966. In August 1988, she became the first black model to appear on the cover of French Vogue, after designer Yves St. Laurent, threatened to withdraw his advertising from the magazine if it didn't place Naomi on its cover. The following year, she appeared on the cover of American Vogue, which marked the first time a black model graced the front of the September magazine, traditionally the year's biggest and most important issue.

In January 1990, Campbell, who was declared "the reigning megamodel of them all" by Interview, appeared with Turlington, Evangelista, Cindy Crawford and Tatjana Patitz on a cover of British Vogue, shot by Peter Lindbergh. The group was subsequently cast to star in the music video for George Michael's "Freedom! '90". By then, Campbell, Turlington, Evangelista, Crawford and Claudia Schiffer formed an elite group of models declared "supermodels" by the fashion industry. With the addition of newcomer Kate Moss, they were collectively known as the "Big Six".

In March 1991, in a defining moment of the so-called supermodel era, Campbell walked the catwalk for Versace with Turlington, Evangelista and Crawford, arm-in-arm and lip-synching the words to "Freedom! '90". Later that year, she starred as Michael Jackson's love interest in the music video for "In the Closet". In April 1992, she posed with several other top models for the hundredth-anniversary cover of American Vogue, shot by Patrick Demarchelier. That same year, she appeared in Madonna's controversial book Sex, in a set of nude photos with Madonna and rapper Big Daddy Kane.

In 1993, Campbell twice appeared on the cover of American Vogue; in April, alongside Christy Turlington, Claudia Schiffer, Stephanie Seymour and Helena Christensen, and again, solo, in June. She also famously fell on the Vivienne Westwood 1993 Fall catwalk in foot-high platform shoes, which were later displayed at the Victoria and Albert Museum in London. Despite her success, however, Elite Model Management, which had represented Campbell since 1987, fired her in September, on the grounds that "no amount of money or prestige could further justify the abuse" to staff and clients.

In the mid-1990s, Campbell branched out into other areas of the entertainment industry. Her novel Swan, about a supermodel dealing with blackmail, was released in 1994 to poor reviews. It was ghostwritten by Caroline Upcher, with Campbell stating that she "just did not have the time to sit down and write a book." That same year, she released her album Baby Woman, which was named after designer Rifat Ozbek's nickname for Campbell. Produced by Youth and Tim Simenon, the album was only commercially successful in Japan; it failed to reach the top 75 on the UK charts, while its only single, "Love and Tears", reached No. 40. Baby Woman was mocked by critics, inspiring the Naomi Awards for terrible pop music. During the mid-1990s, Campbell also had small roles in Miami Rhapsody and Spike Lee's Girl 6, as well as a recurring role on the second season of New York Undercover.

In 1995, along with fellow models Schiffer, Turlington and Elle Macpherson, Campbell invested in a chain of restaurants called the Fashion Cafe, whose directors were arrested three years later for fraud, bankruptcy and money laundering.

1998–2012: Other ventures 

In 1998, Time declared the end of the supermodel era. Campbell continued modelling, both on the runway and, more frequently, on print. In 1999, she signed her first cosmetics contract with Cosmopolitan Cosmetics, a division of Wella, through which she launched several signature fragrances. In November of that year, she posed with 12 other top models for the "Modern Muses" cover of the Millennium Issue of American Vogue, shot by Annie Leibovitz. The following month, she appeared in a white string bikini and furs on the cover of Playboy. In May 2001, she hosted, alongside supermodel Elle Macpherson the 50th Miss Universe pageant. In October 2001, she appeared with rapper Sean "Puff Daddy" Combs on the cover of British Vogue, with the headline "Naomi and Puff: The Ultimate Power Duo".

In 2007, she walked the catwalk for Dior's 60th-anniversary fashion show at Versailles. In July 2008, she appeared with fellow black models Liya Kebede, Sessilee Lopez and Jourdan Dunn on the gatefold cover of a landmark all-black issue of Italian Vogue, shot by Steven Meisel. In September of that year, Campbell reunited with Christy Turlington, Linda Evangelista, Cindy Crawford, Claudia Schiffer and Stephanie Seymour for "A League of Their Own", a Vanity Fair feature on the supermodel legacy.

In 2011, Campbell appeared with Liya Kebede and Iman on the cover of the 40th-anniversary issue of Essence. She also starred as Duran Duran frontman Simon Le Bon in the band's music video for "Girl Panic!", with Cindy Crawford, Helena Christensen, Eva Herzigova and Yasmin Le Bon portraying the other band members; they appeared in the November edition of British Harper's Bazaar in an editorial titled "The Supers vs. Duran Duran". Campbell performed with Kate Moss and other supermodels in the closing ceremony of the 2012 Olympic Games, where they modelled haute couture to represent British fashion. Campbell wore a design by Alexander McQueen—a staggered hem gown with a train speckled with flecks of gold.

2013–present: Continued success 

In March 2013, Campbell graced the inaugural cover of Numéro Russia. Campbell also became involved in reality television through the modelling competition The Face and its international offshoots. In the U.S., she served as a coach and judge, along with Karolina Kurkova and Coco Rocha, on Oxygen's The Face, hosted by photographer Nigel Barker. She also hosted the British version of the show, which aired on Sky Living later that same year, and The Face Australia, which ran on Fox8 in 2014.

In 2014, Campbell covered the May issue of Vogue Australia, the September issue of Vogue Japan, and the November issue of Vogue Turkey; the latter two were special editions celebrating Campbell and fellow supermodels. Campbell also covered the Vietnamese, Singaporean and the 35th anniversary Latin American edition of Harper's Bazaar.
In 2014, Campbell was named TV Personality of the year by Glamour Magazine. The award was presented at the annual Glamour Women of The Year Awards in London.

The following year, she closed the Fall/Winter Zac Posen show at New York Fashion Week, and featured in Spring/Summer 2015 campaigns for Burberry and lingerie retailer Agent Provocateur.

Campbell has walked the runways for Marc Jacobs, Yves Saint Laurent, Chloé, Diane Von Furstenberg, Prada, Chanel, Givenchy, Dolce & Gabbana, Burberry, Zac Posen, Blumarine, Karl Lagerfeld, Gianfranco Ferré, Versace, Helmut Lang, Christian Dior, John Galliano, Ralph Lauren, Jean Paul Gaultier, Tommy Hilfiger, Oscar de la Renta, Michael Kors, Anna Sui, Louis Vuitton, Hermés, Marchesa, Roberto Cavalli and Valentino.

She has appeared in advertising campaigns for Fendi, Burberry, Dolce & Gabbana, Escada, Louis Vuitton, Prada, Ralph Lauren, Chloé, Versace, Givenchy, Blumarine, Yves Saint Laurent, Isaac Mizrahi, Tommy Hilfiger, Valentino, La Perla, Dennis Basso, Philipp Plein, Mango, Thierry Mugler, Balmain, Nars, Roberto Cavalli, David Yurman, Alessandro Dell'Acqua, DSquared2, Express, H&M, Bloomingdale's, Dillard's, Macy's, Barneys New York, Neiman Marcus, Gap, Avon, Revlon and Victoria's Secret.

In 2015, Campbell signed on as a recurring character in the Fox drama Empire as Camilla Marks, a fashion designer and love interest to Hakeem Lyon, portrayed by Bryshere Y. Gray. In October 2015, Campbell was featured in a two-episode arc in American Horror Story: Hotel, as a Vogue fashion editor named Claudia Bankson.

In 2016, Campbell appeared in the music video for Anohni's single "Drone Bomb Me". In September 2017, Campbell appeared in Versace's Spring/Summer 2018 show celebrating the late Gianni Versace, alongside Schiffer, Crawford, Christensen and Carla Bruni and also featured in the campaign for the collection.  In February 2018, Campbell and Moss returned to the runway and closed Kim Jones' final menswear show for Louis Vuitton. In April, she featured on the cover of British GQ alongside rapper Skepta.

In June 2018, Campbell received the Fashion Icon award by the Council of Fashion Designers of America.

In 2019, Campbell received the first beauty contract of her career, with NARS Cosmetics.

In the spring of 2020, amid the COVID-19 pandemic, Campbell began her own web series on YouTube, No Filter with Naomi, in which she conducts conversations with various guests. Her inaugural guest was Cindy Crawford, while subsequent guests ranged from Marc Jacobs, Adut Akech, and Christy Turlington to Ashley Graham and Nicole Richie. The 50th episode of No Filter with Naomi premiered on March 16, 2021, featuring guest Jean Paul Gaultier.

In October 2020, Campbell and Apple TV+ announced a documentary about Campbell and fellow supermodels Cindy Crawford, Linda Evangelista and Christy Turlington, directed by Barbara Kopple. The documentary, named The Supermodels, comes from Brian Grazer's  and Ron Howard's  Imagine Documentaries.

On January 12, 2021, Campbell was appointed as a tourism ambassador by the Kenyan Ministry of Tourism and Wildlife.

In February 2021, Campbell appeared on the cover of i-D magazine's Spring issue, describing it as one of the few times she's had the opportunity to work with a photographer of colour.

In March 2021, Campbell was named as the face of the relaunch advertising campaign for streetwear brand Hood by Air.

In July 2022, Campbell was awarded an honorary doctorate by UCA (University for the Creative Arts) for her impact on global fashion.

Activism and charity 
Despite her status as the most famous black model of her time, Campbell never earned the same volume of advertising assignments as her white colleagues, and she was not signed by a cosmetics company until as late as 1999. In 1991, she said, "I may be considered one of the top models in the world, but in no way do I make the same money as any of them." Throughout her career, Campbell has been outspoken against the racial bias that exists in the fashion industry. In 1997, she stated, "There is prejudice. It is a problem and I can't go along any more with brushing it under the carpet. This business is about selling, and blonde and blue-eyed girls are what sells."

A decade later, she again spoke out against discrimination, stating, "The American president may be black, but as a black woman, I am still an exception in this business. I always have to work harder to be treated equally." In 2013, Campbell joined fellow black models Iman and Bethann Hardison in an advocacy group called "Diversity Coalition". In an open letter to the governing bodies of global fashion weeks, they named high-profile designers who used just one or no models of color in their fall 2013 shows, calling it a "racist act".

Campbell is involved with several charitable causes. She supports the Nelson Mandela Children's Fund, for which she organised a benefit Versace fashion show in 1998. Held at Nelson Mandela's South African presidential residence, the show was the subject of a documentary titled FashionKingdom, or alternatively, Naomi Conquers Africa. Campbell, whose mother has battled breast cancer, also supports Breakthrough Breast Cancer. In 2004, she was featured on FHM's charity single Do Ya Think I'm Sexy?, as well as in the accompanying music video, of which all profits were donated to Breakthrough. She appeared in a print and media campaign for the charity's fundraising initiative Fashion Targets Breast Cancer, and she opened a Breakthrough breast cancer research unit in 2009.

In 2005, Campbell founded the charity We Love Brazil, which aims to raise awareness and funds to fight poverty in Brazil through the sale of fabrics made by local women. That same year, Campbell founded the charity Fashion for Relief, which has organised fund-raising fashion shows to benefit victims of Hurricane Katrina in 2005, the Mumbai terrorist attacks in 2008, the Haiti earthquake in 2010, the Japan earthquake in 2011, and the Syrian refugee crisis in 2017. By 2011, Fashion for Relief had reportedly raised £4.5 million. In 2018 Campbell held another Relief charity gala and the theme was Race To Equality.

In 2012, the charity teamed up with YOOX China and leading global and Chinese fashion designers, including Phillip Lim and Masha Ma, to design Chinese-themed T-shirts to help fund its efforts and the various international charities it works with. Since 2007, Campbell has been the honorary president of Athla Onlus, an Italian organisation that works to further the social integration of young people with learning disabilities. In 2009, Campbell became a goodwill ambassador for the White Ribbon Alliance for Safe Motherhood. She has since joined the charity's patron, Sarah Brown, the wife of former British prime minister Gordon Brown, on several missions to promote maternal health.

Campbell has received recognition for her charitable work. In 2007, she was named an ambassador of Rio de Janeiro by mayor Cesar Maia in recognition of her efforts to fight poverty in Brazil. In 2009, she was awarded Honorary Patronage of Trinity College's University Philosophical Society for her charitable and professional work. In 2010, Sarah Brown presented her with an "Outstanding Contribution" award from British Elle for her work as an ambassador for the White Ribbon Alliance, as well as her work in the fashion industry.

In February 2021, Campbell was a signatory on an open letter decrying Ghana's stance on gay rights. She was joined by other signers, like actor Idris Elba and Vogue Magazine editor-in-chief Edward Enniful.

In July 2021, Campbell condemned racist attacks on black players for the England national football team, including Bukayo Saka, Marcus Rashford and Jadon Sancho, after the team's defeat to Italy in the UEFA Euro 2020 soccer final, disclosing via an Instagram post that it was disgusting to read of the abuses and encouraging players not to let the ignorant voices in. In the same month, Campbell wrote an open letter to former South African president Jacob Zuma, condemning riots and unrest that had broken out in the country following Zuma's incarceration.

Legal issues

Assault cases 
Campbell has been convicted of assault on four occasions, after she was accused eleven times of committing acts of violence against employees, associates and other individuals between 1998 and 2009. During the first such case, heard in February 2000, Campbell pleaded guilty in Toronto to assaulting her personal assistant with a mobile phone in September 1998. Campbell paid her former employee an undisclosed sum and agreed to attend anger management classes; her record was cleared in exchange for her expressing remorse. By 2006, eight other employees and associates had come forward with claims of abuse. During this time, Campbell was photographed wearing a Chip and Pepper T-shirt that read "Naomi Hit Me...and I Loved It".

In January 2007, Campbell pleaded guilty in New York to assaulting her former housekeeper, who had accused Campbell of throwing a BlackBerry personal organiser at her in March 2006. Campbell was sentenced to pay her former employee's medical expenses, attend an anger management program, and perform five days of community service with New York's sanitation department. She attended her community service wearing designer outfits, including fedoras, furs and—upon completion of her sentence—a silver-sequined $300,000 Dolce & Gabbana gown. Campbell detailed her community service experience in a W feature titled "The Naomi Diaries", and subsequently spoofed herself in a Dunkin' Donuts commercial, directed by Zach Braff, which showed her breaking her heel while gardening and throwing it through a window.

In June 2008, Campbell pleaded guilty to assaulting two police officers at London Heathrow Airport two months earlier; she had kicked and spat at the officers following an argument about her lost luggage. She was sentenced to 200 hours of community service and fined £2,300, and was banned for life from British Airways.

In July 2015, Campbell was sentenced to six months' probation by a Sicilian court for her August 2009 assault on a paparazzo photographer; she had hit him with her handbag for taking pictures of her and her then-partner.

Blood diamond scandal 
In August 2010, Campbell made a highly publicised appearance at a war crimes trial against former Liberian president Charles Taylor at the Special Court for Sierra Leone in Leidschendam. She was called to give evidence on a "blood diamond" she allegedly received from Taylor during a Nelson Mandela Children's Fund function in 1997. Campbell initially refused to testify, and—after being subpoenaed—told the court that being there was "a big inconvenience" for her. She testified that she was given "dirty-looking" stones late at night by two unidentified men, and claimed she did not know the diamonds had originated from Taylor until being told so the next morning by a fellow attendee, actress Mia Farrow. However, her account was contradicted by testimonies from Farrow, her former agent Carole White and former Children's Fund director Jeremy Ratcliffe.

Personal life

Family and relationships 
Campbell has never met her biological father. She regards French-based Tunisian fashion designer Azzedine Alaïa, whom she met at 16, as her "papa". She also holds high respect toward record producers Quincy Jones and Chris Blackwell as adopted father figures. Former South African president Nelson Mandela referred to Campbell as his "honorary granddaughter". She first met Mandela in November 1994, after his party, the African National Congress, invited her to travel to South Africa to meet with their leader. She had previously donated the proceeds from a photo shoot in Tanzania to the ANC. Over the years, Campbell has lent support to many of Mandela's political campaigns and humanitarian causes.

In 1993, she became engaged to U2 bassist Adam Clayton. They met in February of that year, after Clayton, when asked in an interview if there was anything in the world he desired but did not have, responded: "A date with Naomi Campbell". Campbell and Clayton separated the following year. In 1995, she dated Leonardo DiCaprio. From 1998 through 2003, she was in a relationship with Formula One racing head Flavio Briatore; she became engaged to him before breaking off the relationship. Campbell now considers Briatore her "mentor". From 2008 until 2013, she was in a relationship with Russian businessman Vladislav Doronin. She also had relationships with Robert De Niro, Hassan Jameel, Sean "Diddy" Combs, and Usher. In 2019, she dated Skepta.

Campbell appears in the alleged contact book and in flight logs of late American financier and convicted sex trafficker Jeffrey Epstein, as well as in photographs with Epstein and his associate Ghislaine Maxwell. In August 2019, Campbell addressed the relationship on her YouTube channel, admitting she knew Epstein after being introduced to him by ex-boyfriend Flavio Briatore, stating: "What he's done is indefensible, when I heard what he had done, it sickened me to my stomach, just like everybody else, because I've had my fair share of sexual predators and thank God I had good people around who protected me from this. I stand with the victims. They're scarred for life. For life." However, Campbell's claims are disputed by Epstein victim Virginia Roberts Giuffre, claiming Campbell was aware and a close friend of Maxwell.

In May 2021, she announced the birth of her daughter. In February 2022, Campbell confirmed to Vogue that her daughter was not adopted, posing with her child for a photoshoot.

Substance abuse 

In 1999, Campbell entered rehab after a five-year cocaine drug addiction and alcohol addiction. Of her choice to first use the drug in 1994, Campbell said in 2005, "I was having fun. I was living this life of travelling the world and having people just give you anything. [But] the little glow in your face goes....It's a very nasty drug."

In 2002, Campbell won a breach of confidentiality lawsuit against the Daily Mirror, after the newspaper published a report of her drug addiction, including a photograph of her leaving a Narcotics Anonymous meeting. The High Court ordered £3,500 in damages from the Daily Mirror. Later that year, the ruling was overturned by the Court of Appeal, which ordered Campbell to pay the newspaper's £350,000 legal costs, but in 2004 the House of Lords reinstated the High Court ruling and damages. In her YouTube series in July 2019, Campbell mentioned that she has quit smoking.

Fragrances 
Since 1999, Campbell has released 25 fragrances for women via her eponymous perfume house, under the Procter & Gamble brand.

Bibliography 
 1994: Swan
 1994: Top Model
 1996: Naomi
 2016: Naomi Campbell

Discography 
Albums
 1994: Baby Woman (Epic, UK, did not chart)

Singles
 1991: "Cool as Ice (Everybody Get Loose)" (Vanilla Ice featuring Naomi Campbell)
 1994: "Love and Tears"
 1994: "I Want to Live"
 1996: "La La La Love Song" (Toshinobu Kubota featuring Naomi Campbell)

Filmography

Films

Documentaries

Television

Music video appearances

See also 

 The Supermodel Trinity

References

External links 

 
 
 
 

1970 births
Living people
English expatriates in Italy
Black British fashion people
English female models
English people of Jamaican descent
English people of Chinese descent
Alumni of the Italia Conti Academy of Theatre Arts
People from Streatham
Participants in American reality television series
People educated at Barbara Speake Stage School
Women Management models